Beaver Township is one of the fourteen townships of Pike County, Ohio, United States.  The 2000 census found 1,450 people in the township, 1,269 of whom lived in the unincorporated portions of the township.

Geography
Located in the eastern part of the county, it borders the following townships:
Jackson Township - north
Liberty Township, Jackson County - east
Scioto Township, Jackson County - southeast
Marion Township - south
Union Township - southwest
Seal Township - west

Part of the village of Beaver is located in southeastern Beaver Township.

Name and history
Beaver Township most likely takes its name from Beaver Creek.  Statewide, other Beaver Townships are located in Mahoning and Noble counties.

Government
The township is governed by a three-member board of trustees, who are elected in November of odd-numbered years to a four-year term beginning on the following January 1. Two are elected in the year after the presidential election and one is elected in the year before it. There is also an elected township fiscal officer, who serves a four-year term beginning on April 1 of the year after the election, which is held in November of the year before the presidential election. Vacancies in the fiscal officership or on the board of trustees are filled by the remaining trustees.

References

External links
Pike County visitors bureau website

Townships in Pike County, Ohio
Townships in Ohio